Peshawar school attack may refer to:

2014 Peshawar school massacre
2020 Peshawar school bombing